Admiral Fairfax may refer to:

Donald McNeill Fairfax (1818–1894), U.S. Navy rear admiral
Henry Fairfax (Royal Navy officer) (1837–1900), British Royal Navy admiral
Robert Fairfax (Royal Navy officer) (1666–1725), British Royal Navy rear admiral
William George Fairfax (1739–1813), British Royal Navy vice admiral